M9 is a major metropolitan route in Johannesburg, South Africa. Passing through the heart of the Witwatersrand, it connects the southern suburbs of Johannesburg via the centre of Johannesburg, with the northern suburbs and business centres of Rosebank and Sandton before ending in the outer northern suburbs.

Route
The southern terminus begins as T-junction with Turf Club Street in Turffontein. From this junction, it heads north as Turffontein Road passing the Turffontein Racecourse on its right. After passing Wembley Stadium, the road becomes Eloff Street, passing over a railway track into Village Deep. The M9 interchanges with the M2 freeway passing under it into the Johannesburg CBD. In Marshalltown, it turns left into Anderson Street then right into Rissik Street. Rissik Street crosses major roadways, the R29 Marshall Street, R24 Commissioner Street and Albertina Sisulu Road where it passes the old Johannesburg City Hall. Continuing north through the CBD, it crosses over the John Rissik Bridge and the railway lines of the Johannesburg Park Station, the city's main railway station, and into Braamfontein. Climbing the ridge, the road splits left, becoming Loveday Street, passing the Joburg Theatre on its left and the Civic Buildings to the right. At the top of the ridge, it turns right into Hoofd Street and then left into Joubert Street passing the Old Fort and the Constitutional Court of South Africa on Constitutional Hill. The road now descends the hill heading north towards Parktown, passing the old Transvaal Memorial Hospital for Children and the old maternity hospital, intersecting and crosses the M17/M71 Empire Road.

Now called Victoria Avenue, it passes Pieter Roos Park crossing St Andrews Road and then passes the Wits Business School, the University of the Witwatersrand's Education Campus and the Nelson Mandela Children's Hospital. At the intersection with Oxford Road the M9 turns right onto the latter and is briefly parallel with the M1 North freeway before crossing under it heading north-east before turning north in Killarney and it is intersected by the R25 11th Avenue in Riviera. Crossing the M20 Bolton and Glenhove Road's it passes between the commercial area of Rosebank and the suburb of Melrose to the right. As it passes Jellicoe Avenue, the M9 turns north-east and passes by Dunkeld and Melrose. Shortly after passing the M30 Corlett Drive, the route turns north-west as Rivonia Road and heads through Hyde Park and Illovo. In Sandhurst, the road turns north-east again and crosses the M85 Sandton Drive and Katherine Street into the Sandton central business district.

Turning north-west in the Sandton CBD, it will leave the area crossing the M40 Grayston Drive into Benmore Gardens and Sandown where it then turns north-east into Morningside. Crossing Kelvin Drive into Rivonia, the M9 Rivonia Road now kinks north-west then north as it passes through Edenburg, the suburbs main commercial area. Crossing 12th Avenue, the route enters Woodmead and soon intersects and crosses under the N1 Highway (Western Bypass) at the Rivonia Road Interchange and the R564 Witkoppen Road continuing north into Paulshof and Sunninghill. After a short distance it becomes Leeukop Road and at the entrance to Leeukop Prison, the road turns north-east as Malindi Road and after 2.4 km in Barbeque Downs the road intersects and ends as a T-junction with the R55 Woodmead Drive.

References

Streets and roads of Johannesburg
Metropolitan routes in Johannesburg